Sudden Strike is a series of real-time tactics video games set during World War II. The series is developed by Fireglow based in Russia and published by CDV software of Germany and has been re-published by ZOOM-Platform.com. The player selects a faction (e.g. Soviets, Germans, or Allied forces) and gains control of many varied units such as infantry, tanks and artillery. The games focus primarily on tactics, eschewing traditional real-time strategy resource gathering and base development.

Games

Sudden Strike

The original Sudden Strike, released in 2000, included three campaigns (Soviets, Germans, and Allied forces). The battles are presented in an isometric perspective with line-of-sight occlusions and practical cover. Sudden Strike helped pioneer the real-time tactics genre, building upon concepts established by Counter Action for DOS, which was published by Mindscape in 1996.

Sudden Strike 2

Sudden Strike 2 was also developed by Russian developer Fireglow and published by CDV and was released in 2002. The game has since undergone minor changes in its game engine and now features a higher resolution setting and other graphical changes. The campaign still involves the Soviets and Allies, against the Germans and a new country, Japan.

Sudden Strike 3: Arms for Victory

Sudden Strike 3 is the third title in the series and the first to incorporate a 3D graphics engine.

Sudden Strike: The Last Stand
It was released in June 2010. It is a sequel to Sudden Strike 3 which brings back a few features from Sudden Strike 2. The user interface is reworked in order to make it easier for player to control units and realize their tactics in the game.

Sudden Strike 4

The game was announced in August 2016 and was released in August 2017. It was developed by Kite Games and published by Kalypso Media for PlayStation 4 and PC. While the developers hoped to remain true to the spirit of other games in the series, new skill trees and commander roles were introduced as features.

See also
 Stranger, also developed by Fireglow
 Cold War Conflicts, also developed by Fireglow

References

Real-time tactics video games
Video game franchises
Video game franchises introduced in 2000
Video games developed in Russia
World War II video games